The IPW United States Tag Team Championship is a tag team championship in Innovate Pro Wrestling.  On August 19, 2017 at ReGenesis, promoter Tony Givens announced that NWA Smoky Mountain Wrestling was leaving the NWA thus the promotion was changing their name to Innovate Pro Wrestling.  The Ugly Ducklings (who were the last NWA United States Tag Team Champions before IPW left the NWA) defeated The Brotherhood (Myron Reed and Mickey Midas) to become the first United States Tag Team Champions under the Innovate Wrestling banner.

Title history

Names

Reigns

|}

Combined reigns

By team

By wrestler

See also
NWA United States Tag Team Championship (Tennessee version)

References

Tag team wrestling championships
Professional wrestling in Tennessee
United States professional wrestling championships